Gerry  Bertier (pronounced like "Gary"; August 20, 1953 – March 20, 1981) was a high school American football player and Paralympian. He became known for his participation on the 1971 Virginia State Champion football T. C. Williams High School team, and their portrayal in the Disney film Remember the Titans. He was the nephew of Howie Livingston. He also attended Northern Virginia Community College. After the conclusion of the 1971 season, Bertier was involved in an automobile crash that left him paralyzed from the waist down. Despite this injury, Bertier remained an active athlete, participating in the Paralympics. In 2006, Bertier's family started the " Bertier #42 Foundation," dedicated to raising money for research on spinal cord injuries. There is also a gymnasium at Alexandria City High School (formally T.C. Williams) that bears his name.

Life and career

Childhood
Bertier's parents divorced when he was around age eight and he was raised primarily by his mother, until she was remarried to Robert Agnew. As a child and young man, Bertier was described as an amiable, goal-oriented individual. Growing up, Bertier frequently discussed his lifetime goal of winning a gold medal in the Olympics, and as an active participant in various athletics, seemed to be on track for this goal.

High school career
Bertier began his high school career at Hammond High School and joined the football team. He became a key player, soon becoming the backbone of the defense. As a sophomore, he was starting linebacker, a position for which he won many honors. However, he was only able to play three seasons, when Hammond H.S. was merged with two other Alexandria high schools to form T.C. Williams High School. The consolidation meant there were many new faces on the football team as well as on the coaching staff, which caused racial tension between team members. This new mixture of Titans was forced to come together as a single successful team, dealing with the issue of racial prejudice, a difficult battle for many members of the team. As a captain, Bertier, along with friend and teammate defensive end Julius Campbell, supported their teammates through this time of struggle. Even though the team was still struggling with prejudice as the season opener rolled around, the strife was not evident in the way the T.C. Titans began the 1971 season. The Titans went 13–0, including nine shutouts, and went on to win the Virginia State Championship. During the Titans' undefeated season, they also outscored their opponents by a 357-45 margin. Bertier's stats during the season included 142 tackles and 42 sacks. Bertier was named team Defensive Most Valuable Player. He was named National Prep School Football Player of the Year and received First Team All-Region, All-State, and All-American honors. As he prepared to move to the next level, Bertier received many football scholarships offers from prominent colleges like Notre Dame and University of Alabama.

Car crash
On December 11, 1971, Bertier had been at a banquet honoring the players of the 1971 T.C. Williams Titans football team for their undefeated season. After the banquet, Bertier borrowed his mother's new 1971 Chevrolet Camaro. Bertier lost control of the Camaro and crashed. He was moved to the operating room when he was stabilized. Although doctors tried to relieve pressure on his spine to help him regain some feeling, it was unsuccessful. Bertier coordinated with junior colleges in Alexandria to set up a "Walk for Mankind," and he encouraged students, adults, company executives to donate. Bertier occasionally met with others who survived similar injuries, helping them with their rehabilitation. Outside of his hometown, he made speeches across the country for rights for the disabled. He addressed subjects such as making buildings accessible to disabled people. Bertier worked for Abbey Medical selling medical equipment to disabled people, a position that allowed him to attend wheelchair sporting events held nationally.

Paralympics
After Bertier recuperated from his injuries, he once again became a competitive athlete. According to his sister, Becky Britt, "During Gerry's childhood he had mentioned being in the Olympics. His long-term goal was to receive a gold medal." He decided to occupy himself in Wheelchair Track and Field, the Wheelchair Basketball League, and the United States Paralympics, setting state and national records.

Death 
On March 20, 1981, Bertier was critically injured in a car crash while returning home from a business trip. Driving alone, his southbound 1980 Oldsmobile collided with a northbound car that crossed over the center line on Route 20 in Charlottesville, Virginia. Bertier died afterwards from his injuries in the University of Virginia hospital. A man from Schuyler, Virginia, was charged with manslaughter and driving under the influence of alcohol in connection with the accident.

Portrayal in Remember the Titans 
Bertier was portrayed in the Disney film Remember the Titans by actor Ryan Hurst. While some elements of the film have a historical basis, there are certain aspects of Bertier's portrayal that are not completely factual. The crash that left him paralyzed happened after the State Championship game, on the night of a banquet celebrating the team's success, rather than a few days before the final game. The name of Bertier's girlfriend and Bertier and Campbell's relationship, for example, were misrepresented. Bertier's on-the-field portrayal in the film, however, is almost entirely correct. As the team's defensive captain, Bertier was a dominating force on the linebacking corps and received All-American honors following the team's championship season. Although heralded as an exceptional leader on and off the football field, Bertier's duties never included cutting fellow players from the team as he was shown doing in the film.

Bertier #42 Foundation 
After becoming paralyzed, Bertier became very active in assisting other survivors of spinal cord injuries. Bertier frequented the spinal cord injury wards of local hospitals to help them with their acceptance of the injury and eventually their rehabilitation. After Bertier died in 1981, his sister, Becky Britt, decided to continue his legacy. In 2006, she created the " Bertier #42 Foundation", to build upon Bertier's tradition of helping survivors of spinal cord injuries. The foundation is dedicated to raising money for the research of spinal cord injuries and works with the Virginia Commonwealth University to host annual fundraising golf tournaments. These tournaments draw the support of many Virginia residents, including several members of the 1971 T.C. Williams championship team. The second annual tournament was held September 29, 2007, at the Cannon Ridge Golf Club of Fredericksburg, Virginia. Proceeds were donated to the Spinal Cord Injury Rehabilitation and Research Center of the Virginia Commonwealth University Health System (VCUHS). The 2007 tournament raised approximately $20,000 for donation to the VCUHS.

See also 
 Herman Boone
 Ronnie Bass

References

1953 births
1981 deaths
American people with disabilities
High school football players in the United States
People with paraplegia
Sportspeople from Alexandria, Virginia
Players of American football from Virginia
Road incident deaths in Virginia
Paralympic track and field athletes of the United States
T. C. Williams High School alumni